Zilupe may refer to:

Zilupe, a town in Latvia
Zilupe Municipality, Latvia
Zilupe, the Latvian name for the Sinyaya, a river in Latvia, Belarus and Russia